Gerardus (Gerard) van der Leeuw (18 March 1890 – 18 November 1950) was a Dutch historian and philosopher of religion, ordained minister and politician.

Gerard van der Leeuw studied theology and egyptology at Leiden University, in Göttingen and Berlin. He was promoted there to doctor of theology in Leiden in 1916. After graduation he was called as ordained minister in the Dutch Reformed Church (Nederlandse Hervormde Kerk): in The Hague as candidate and subsequently in 's-Heerenberg with a full appointment. In 1918 he was appointed as professor in history of religion at the University of Groningen.

He applied the concept of phenomenology to religion. He is best known for his work Religion in Essence and Manifestation: A Study in Phenomenology, an application of philosophical phenomenology to religion. It was first published in 1933 under the German title Phänomenologie der Religion and translated into English in 1938.

From 1945–1946 van der Leeuw was Minister of Education of the Netherlands for the Labour Party (appointed immediately after the end of the war). Before the war he had been a member of the conservative Christian Historical Union.

External links

References 

1890 births
1950 deaths
Ministers of Education of the Netherlands
Members of the House of Representatives (Netherlands)
Labour Party (Netherlands) politicians
20th-century Dutch philosophers
Politicians from The Hague
Philosophers of religion
Phenomenologists
Academic staff of the University of Groningen